North Norfolk District Council in Norfolk, England is elected every four years.

Political control
Since the first elections to the council in 1973 political control of the council has been held by the following parties:

Leadership
The leaders of the council since 2011 have been:

Council elections
1973 Pastonacres District Council election
1976 North Norfolk District Council election
1979 North Norfolk District Council election (New ward boundaries)
1983 North Norfolk District Council election
1987 North Norfolk District Council election
1991 North Norfolk District Council election
1995 North Norfolk District Council election
1999 North Norfolk District Council election
2003 North Norfolk District Council election (New ward boundaries increased the number of councillors by 2)
2007 North Norfolk District Council election
2011 North Norfolk District Council election
2015 North Norfolk District Council election
2019 North Norfolk District Council election

By-election results

1995-1999

1999-2003

2003-2007

2007-2011

2015-present

References

By-election results

External links
North Norfolk District Council

 
Council elections in Norfolk
District council elections in England